Neste sommer is the sixth studio album by Norwegian rock band deLillos.

Track listing
"Langfredag i Aarhus (del 1)"
"Kokken Tor"
"Glemte minner"
"Fornøyd"
"Uendelig trist"
"Søvn"
"Postmann"
"Album"
"Neste sommer"
"Ved porten der jeg bor"
"Søster"
"Langfredag i Aarhus (del 2)"

1993 albums
DeLillos albums
Sonet Records albums